Pants-Off Dance-Off (PODO) is a dance contest that premiered on April 18, 2006 on Fuse. It features stripteasers as they dance while disrobing.

Format

In each episode, five contestants striptease to a music video, while interviews, soundbites and photos reveal stories about each so-called "pancer". For the first two seasons, the audience selected each episode’s winner by texting their vote. The third season used a format where judges selected the weekly winner. Each episode's winner received $200 and the opportunity to compete in a championship at the end of the season.

In October 2009 the show was launched in the UK on MTV's new channel Viva. The show had a completely new look, transmitted in double bill episodes and was also narrated by comedian Ross Lee. There is no cash prize on the UK version and there is no overall winner.

A Much Music version aired in Canada which involved the dancers stripping, often with the use of "mystery object", while an unseen narrator makes jokes.

Hosts
The first season was hosted by Tila Tequila and Krista Ayne. Former child star Jodie Sweetin joined the show as host for Season 2. Willa Ford hosted Season 3.

Production
The show's creator is Tad Low.

External links
 
 New York Times review, July 16, 2006
 New York Post review, March 11, 2007
 'Pants Off Dance Off's strippers are real yelping, whooping, I'm-mad-me irritants' - Review by Charlie Brooker, The Guardian, 31 October 2009

Fuse (TV channel) original programming
2006 American television series debuts
2007 American television series endings
Dance competition television shows